Makin' It is an American sitcom starring David Naughton that aired for nine episodes on Fridays at 8:00PM on ABC from February 1 to March 23, 1979. It also aired in the United Kingdom on ITV from March 21, 1979.

In 2002, TV Guide ranked Makin' it at number 40 on its TV Guide's 50 Worst TV Shows of All Time list.

Synopsis
The show was set in Passaic, New Jersey, and was about the daily life of Billy Manucci, a young man who frequented the local disco club, Inferno, at night while working at an ice cream parlor called Tasti-Queen during the day. Manucci was highly influenced by the disco craze and specifically by the movie Saturday Night Fever. Ellen Travolta, co-star of Saturday Night Fever and John Travolta's sister, played Manucci's mother.

Makin' It had the misfortune of coming to air near the end of the disco fad as backlash against the disco culture (such as the one portrayed in the show) was rising in the United States, culminating in Disco Demolition Night in the summer of 1979. As such, it lasted only eight weeks on air before being canceled. It ranked #104 out of 114 shows airing that season, with an 11.9 rating and a 20 share. The show was one of six whose cancellation was announced by ABC on the same day in April 1979, all listed in the same release in an issue of TV Guide, the other five series being Welcome Back, Kotter, What's Happening!!, Delta House, Starsky & Hutch and the original Battlestar Galactica, which was gone after a single season despite its phenomenal popularity.

Robert Stigwood, the producer of Saturday Night Fever as well as the Bee Gees' manager, was involved in the show's creation, as was Garry Marshall. The theme song, sung by David Naughton, reached #5 on the Billboard Top 40 charts in 1979.  It entered the Top 40 on May 12, nearly two months after the show had been canceled.  The song was also featured in the Bill Murray movie Meatballs as well as the GameCube dance game MC Groovz Dance Craze. The song was also featured in the movie Detroit Rock City, despite the fact the movie is set in 1978 and Makin' It was released in 1979.

Cast
 David Naughton – Billy Manucci
 Greg Antonacci – Tony Manucci
 Denise Miller – Tina Manucci
 Ellen Travolta – Dorothy Manucci
 Lou Antonio – Joseph Manucci
 Ralph Seymour – Al "Kingfish" Sorrentino
 Rebecca Balding – Corky Crandall
 Jennifer Perito – Ivy Papastegios
 Gary Prendergast – Bernard Fusco
 Wendy Hoffman – Suzanne

Episodes

References

External links
 
 

1979 American television series debuts
1979 American television series endings
1970s American sitcoms
American Broadcasting Company original programming
English-language television shows
Passaic, New Jersey
Television series by CBS Studios
Television shows set in New Jersey